Julia DeForest Tuttle (née Sturtevant; January 22, 1849 – September 14, 1898) was an American businesswoman who owned the property upon which Miami, Florida, was built. For this reason, she is called the "Mother of Miami." She is the only woman to have founded what would become a major American city.

History

Julia Sturtevant was the daughter of Ephraim Sturtevant, a Florida planter and state senator.  She married Frederick Leonard Tuttle on January 22, 1867. They had two children: a daughter, Frances Emeline (b. 1868), and a son, Henry Ethelbert (b. 1870). Julia Tuttle first visited the Biscayne Bay region of southern Florida in 1875 with her husband, visiting a 40-acre (16 ha) orange grove her father had purchased. She loved the experience, but returned to Cleveland, Ohio, with her family.

Moving to southern Florida
Tuttle came to Fort Dallas, Florida, from Cleveland, Ohio, on a steamship after her father and mother had moved to South Florida. A little over ten years later, in 1886, her husband died; the foundry had already been sold. Upon his death, she found that her husband had not been good at managing money. This placed Julia in dire financial straits. To supplement her small income, she had to turn their four-story home into a boarding house and tearoom for young ladies.  In 1890, when her father died and left her his land in Florida, she sold her home in Cleveland, Ohio and relocated to Biscayne Bay.

This was converted into her home. In 1891, Tuttle brought her family to live there. She repaired and converted the home into one of the show places in the area with a sweeping view of the river and Biscayne Bay.

Tuttle immediately decided to take a leading role in the movement to start a new city on the Miami River, but knew that decent transportation (in that time, a railroad) was necessary to attract development. Tuttle tried to induce Henry Flagler to extend his railroad to Fort Dallas (Miami), and offered to divide her large real estate holdings if he would do this. She wanted to extend it to that place because she wanted to make it easier to get around. She wrote numerous letters to Flagler in this connection and finally made the trip to St. Augustine and in person repeated her offer.  Her efforts were of no avail at that time; however, providence favored Tuttle. The Great Freeze of 1894-1895 devastated the old orange belt of central and northern Florida, destroying valuable groves and wiping out fortunes overnight.

Either Flagler then recalled Tuttle's story of the tropical Biscayne Bay weather and sent some men to investigate, or Tuttle alerted Flagler that the freeze had spared the Miami River, sending as evidence a bouquet of flowers and foliage (possibly oranges) to Flagler, whose order to extend the Florida East Coast Railway was then given. On February 15, 1896, Joseph B. Reilly, John Sewell, and E.G. Sewell, the vanguard of the Flagler forces, arrived, and the work of building the Royal Palm Hotel was commenced.

Under an agreement between the two, Tuttle supplied Flagler with the land for a hotel and a railroad station for free, and they split the remainder of her 640 acres (2.6 km²) north of the Miami River in alternating sections. On April 22, 1896, train service of the Florida East Coast Railway came to the area. On July 28, male residents voted to incorporate a new city, Miami. Thereafter, the city steadily grew from a small town to a metropolis.

Death and legacy
In 1898, Tuttle fell ill with apparent meningitis. Plans were made to move her to Asheville, North Carolina, by rail for treatment, but her condition deteriorated before she could be transported. She died on September 14, 1898, at age 49. Her funeral took place at her Fort Dallas home, and she was buried in a place of honor at the City of Miami Cemetery. Her tombstone notes her year of birth as 1848, while other sources list 1849.

Tuttle died leaving a large amount of debt, partly the result of her altruistic land grants to Flagler. Her children sold her remaining land to pay off the debt. For that reason, her name was mostly forgotten until it was placed on a causeway for Interstate 195 over Biscayne Bay. In contrast, the name of William Brickell, a large landowner on the south side of the Miami River who contributed to Tuttle's efforts to incorporate the city, was widely used on the south side of what became Miami.

Just as Tuttle is called the Mother of Miami, Flagler became known as the Father of Miami. Coincidentally, both Tuttle and Brickell had previously lived in Cleveland, where they first met.

In addition to the Julia Tuttle Causeway, the memory of Tuttle has been honored with a sculpture in Bayfront Park, by Daub and Firmin.

References

Sources

Akin, Edward N.. The Cleveland Connection: Revelations from the John D. Rockefeller - Julia Tuttle Correspondences. In Tequesta: the Journal of the Historical Association of Southern Florida, no. XLII (1982). 
Frank, Andrew K. Before the Pioneers: Indians, Settlers, Slaves, and the Founding of Miami (University Press of Florida, 2017)
Peters, Thelma. Biscayne Country, 1870-1926. Miami, Fla.: Banyan Books, c1981.
Tuttle Family Papers. Finding aid. Tuttle Family Papers - 1889-1954 -
Wiggins, Larry. The Birth of the City of Miami. In Tequesta: the Journal of the Historical Association of Southern Florida, no. LV (1995).

Further reading 
 

1849 births
1898 deaths
American city founders
American real estate businesspeople
Businesspeople in agriculture
History of Miami
19th-century American businesspeople
Businesspeople from Miami
19th-century American businesswomen
Florida Women's Hall of Fame Inductees